Ross Davidson is a Scottish actor.

Ross Davidson may also refer to:

Ross Davidson (footballer, born 1973), English footballer played for Sheffield United and Shrewsbury Town
Ross Davidson (footballer, born 1989), English footballer plays for Kidsgrove Athletic
Ross Davidson (footballer, born 1993), Scottish footballer plays for Albion Rovers